Julie Cordua is known for serving as the chief executive officer and executive director of Thorn since 2012, and previously serving as the vice president of marketing at (RED).

Education & personal life 

Cordua has an MBA from the Kellogg School of Management at Northwestern University and a bachelor’s degree in communications from UCLA. Cordua was born and raised in Lindsay, California, a small rural town, and currently resides in Southern California, along with her three children.

Career

Cordua spent nearly ten years in the wireless industry, leading Motorola's global marketing efforts for 5 years, where she helped launch the Razr. Following her work at Motorola, she joined and helped establish Helio, a wireless startup, as director of buzz marketing.

Thorn

Cordua left her job at RED to join co-founders Ashton Kutcher and Demi Moore in launching Thorn, an anti-human trafficking organization whose mission is to create technology to defend children from abuse online and to remove all child sexual abuse material from the internet. As CEO of the organization, Cordua works with other NGO's, technology companies, government, and law enforcement to assist efforts to identify, protect and rescue victims, and to fight predatory online behavior. In 2017 Cordua noted in Recode that Thorn had an unusual business model, as a non-profit that was also driven by products and technology. One product they have developed, Spotlight, helps law enforcement in the United States and Canada identify victims of child sexual abuse and traffickers, and as of 2018 had led to the identification of 5,894 child sex trafficking victims and the rescue of 103 children. The Spotlight program uses pattern recognition technology from Amazon to identify text and images that might contain or relate to child sexual abuse online. The organization has faced some criticism around the program due to concerns about privacy and the company's stance towards adult sex workers. Another product developed by Thorn is called Safer, and is a tool that allows websites that host user submitted images and videos to identify child sexual abuse material. Thorn also started another program, their Innovation Lab, to collaborate with tech companies including Google, Facebook, Microsoft, Expedia, IAC, Sabre, Twitter, Amazon Web Services and Pinterest to police child sexual abuse material on their sites. In 2019, Thorn was one of eight organizations that were awarded a total of $280 million in funding by the TED launched Audacious Project.

Honors

Cordua has been the recipient of several notable awards and honors for her work with Thorn, including being named as one of the Forbes Leaders Proving Tech Is A Force For Social Innovation in 2019. She was also a recipient of the Skoll Award for Social Entrepreneurship the same year.
In 2017, Cordua was number 51 on the Recode 100 honoree list.

Works and publications 

 Cordua, Julie (April 2019) "How We Won Millions of Dollars from TED to End Child Pornography" Marie Claire
 Cordua, Julie (2019) “How we can eliminate child sexual abuse material from the internet” Ted.com
 Cordua, Julie (November 2013) “Creating An Army of Digital Defenders To Stop Child Sexual Exploitation” Huffington Post

References

Further reading

 Trafficking of children
 (RED)
 Thorn

External links
Thorn

Living people
American social entrepreneurs
American women business executives
Northwestern University alumni
University of California, Los Angeles alumni
Year of birth missing (living people)
People from Lindsay, California
21st-century American women